This is a list of the paramounts of the Xhosa of the Eastern Cape province in modern South Africa.

Rarabe kaPhalo (1773–1787)
Mlawu kaRarabe, (he never became a King because he died before his father)
Ndlambe kaRarabe, Regent (1787–1797)
Ngqika kaMlawu (1797–1829)
Maqoma, Regent (1829–1840)
Mgolombane Sandile (1840–1878)
Edmund Gonya Sandile (1878–n/a)
Faku Sandile, (Not to be confused with the Amampondo King) (1932–1954)
Archie Velile Sandile (1954–1965)
Mxolisi Bazindlovu Sandile (1965–1985)
Nolizwe Sandile, Queen Regent (1985–1991)
Maxhoba Zanesizwe Sandile (1991–2011)
Noloyiso Sandile, Queen Regent (2011–2020)
Jonguxolo Sandile (2020–Present)

See also

Gcaleka
Rharhabe
Sandile (disambiguation)
Sebe (surname)
Sigcawu
List of rulers of the Gcaleka
List of Xhosa Chiefs
List of Xhosa Kings
List of Xhosa people

References

Xhosa people
Eastern Cape
Rharhabe
Rharhabe